Khlong Luang Phaeng railway station is a railway station in central Thailand, located in the Khum Thong Subdistrict, Lat Krabang District in the boundary between Bangkok and Chachoengsao Province.

This station is a third class railway station and is located 39.50 km (about 24 mi) from Hua Lamphong railway station, and considered the last stop of the eastern line in the Bangkok's area.

Train services 
 Ordinary train No. 275/276 Bangkok - Aranyaprathet - Bangkok
 Ordinary train No. 277/278 Bangkok - Kabin Buri - Bangkok
 Ordinary train No. 279/280 Bangkok - Aranyaprathet - Bangkok
 Ordinary train No. 281/282 Bangkok - Kabin Buri - Bangkok
 Ordinary train No. 283/284 Bangkok - Ban Phlu Ta Luang - Bangkok
 Ordinary train No. 285/286 Bangkok - Chachoengsao Junction - Bangkok
 Ordinary train No. 367/368 Bangkok - Chachoengsao Junction - Bangkok
 Ordinary train No. 371/372 Bangkok - Prachin Buri - Bangkok
 Ordinary train No. 376/378 Rangsit - Hua Takhe - Bangkok
 Ordinary train No. 379/380 Bangkok - Hua Takhe - Bangkok
 Ordinary train No. 381/382 Bangkok - Chachoengsao Junction - Bangkok
 Ordinary train No. 383/384 Bangkok - Chachoengsao Junction - Bangkok
 Ordinary train No. 385/386 Bangkok - Chachoengsao Junction - Bangkok
 Ordinary train No. 389/390 Bangkok - Chachoengsao Junction - Bangkok
 Ordinary train No. 391/394 Bangkok - Chachoengsao Junction - Bangkok

References 

Railway stations in Thailand